The Men's Individual normal hill ski jumping event at the FIS Nordic World Ski Championships 2011 was held on 26 February 2011 at 15:00 CET with the qualification being held on 25 February 2011 at 12:30 CET. Wolfgang Loitzl of Austria was the defending world champion while Switzerland's Simon Ammann was the defending Olympic champion.

Results

Qualifying

Competition Round

References

FIS Nordic World Ski Championships 2011